Gabriel Bernal (24 March 1956-June 12, 2014) was a Mexican professional boxer. He was the WBC and Lineal Flyweight Champion for six months in 1984 and a super champion in the ring in the 1970s.

Pro career
Bernal came from Cruz Grande, Mexico. He was a top-ten Flyweight contender when he went to Tokyo to face the hometown favorite Koji Kobayashi for the WBC, The Ring and Lineal Flyweight Championships. Bernal would defeat Kobayashi by second-round knockout.  Two months later, Bernal successfully defended his titles in Nîmes, France, defeating Antoine Montero by an eleventh-round knockout.  This was significant because the previous six WBC Flyweight Champions had all lost their title in their first defence.

Bernal is remembered for his series of fights with Thailand's Sot Chitalada.  For Bernal's second defense, he went to Bangkok to face Chitalada.  He lost a twelve-round decision on 8 October 1984.   Eight months later, Bernal travelled back to Bangkok in an attempt to wrest the title from Chitalada.   On 22 June 1985, Bernal fought Chitalada to a draw after twelve rounds, and Chitalada kept the title.   Bernal had one more shot eighteen months later, travelling again to Bangkok, where on 10 December 1986 he lost another twelve-round decision to Chitalada.   It was his final attempt to win the Flyweight title.

Bernal fought for another six years, but was never the same fighter.   On 11 April 1992 he lost a 12-round decision to former WBC Bantamweight Champion, Miguel Lora.  He fought once more before retiring, finishing his career with a record of 43-14-3 and 28 KOs.

See also
List of flyweight boxing champions
List of WBC world champions
List of Mexican boxing world champions

References

External links
 
Gabriel Bernal - CBZ Profile

1956 births
2014 deaths
Boxers from Guerrero
Flyweight boxers
World boxing champions
World flyweight boxing champions
World Boxing Council champions
Mexican male boxers
Southpaw boxers